Pugachyov may refer to:
Alla Pugacheva (b. 1949) Russian musical performer
Yemelyan Pugachev (c. 1742–1775), leader of the Cossack insurrection in Russia
 Pugachev (1937 film), a Soviet drama film
 Pugachev (1978 film), a biopic film
 Pugachyov (air base), an air base in Saratov Oblast, Russia
Pugachyov, a town in Saratov Oblast, Russia
Sergei Pugachev (born 1963), Russian politician
Viktor Pugachev (born 1948), Russian test pilot
Pugachev's Cobra, named for the pilot